The women's 100 metre freestyle competition of the swimming events at the 2012 European Aquatics Championships took place May 22, 2012 (heats) and May 23, 2012 (final).

Records
Prior to the competition, the existing world, European and championship records were as follows.

Results

Heats
62 swimmers participated in 8 heats.

Semifinals
The eight fasters swimmers advanced to the final.

Semifinal 1

Semifinal 2

Final
The final was held at 18.13.

References

Women's 100 m freestyle